Katarína Macová (born 19 February 1986 in Bratislava) is a Slovak slalom canoeist who competed at the international level from 2004 to 2013.

She started out in the K1 class, but moved over to the single canoe (C1) class since its inception for women in 2010. She won a bronze medal in the C1 event at the 2011 ICF Canoe Slalom World Championships in Bratislava. She also won gold at the European Canoe Slalom Championships in 2010 on the same course, becoming the first European Champion in the women's C1 event.

World Cup individual podiums

References

Living people
Slovak female canoeists
1986 births
Medalists at the ICF Canoe Slalom World Championships
Sportspeople from Bratislava